Chinyere Wilfred  is a Nigerian actress and film producer.

Biography 
Wilfred was born on March 23, 1970 in Aguluezechukwu, Anambra State. She is married and has three sons. She has a twin sister called Chinelo Mojekwu.

In 2022 she was a co-star in the Nigerian streaming series Diiche which was produced by James Omokwe and starring Uzoamaka Aniunoh. Her co-stars were Uzoamaka Onuoha, Gloria Young and Frank Konwea. The premier in October in Lagos was hosted by Chigul.

Selected filmography

References

External links 

Living people
1970 births
Igbo actresses
21st-century Nigerian actresses
Actresses from Anambra State
Nigerian film actresses
Nigerian film producers
Lagos State Polytechnic alumni